Victor Valdez (born April 6, 2004) is an American soccer player who plays as a midfielder for USL Championship club LA Galaxy II.

References

External links
Victor Valdez at US Soccer Development Academy

2004 births
Living people
LA Galaxy II players
USL Championship players
American soccer players
Association football midfielders
Soccer players from California
Sportspeople from Santa Ana, California